Seneca–Onderdonk–Woodward Historic District is a national historic district in Ridgewood, Queens, New York.  It includes 211 contributing buildings built in 1911–1912.  They consist mainly of three story brick tenements with two apartments per floor.  The buildings feature amber brick facades with burnt orange brick bases and trim.

It was listed on the National Register of Historic Places in 1983.

References

Ridgewood, Queens
Historic districts on the National Register of Historic Places in Queens, New York
Historic districts in Queens, New York